Qonto is a French online payment institution for freelancers and SMEs.

The financial technology company was founded in 2016 and the initial product was launched in July 2017 in France.

The service has been expanded to Spain, Germany and Italy since 2019.

History 
The company was created in April 2016.

In January 2017, Qonto raised €1,6 million in a seed round with Alven Capital, by billionaire Peter Thiel's Valar Ventures and a few business angels.

In July 2017, Qonto raised another €10 million from existing investors Valar Ventures and Alven Capital and launches its service. Six months after the launch, 5.000 companies were using the service and in April 2018, Qonto had more than 10,000 clients.

In July 2018, Qonto obtained the licence to be a payment institution from the French Prudential Supervision and Resolution Authority. Qonto does not have a banking licence. 

In September 2018, Qonto raised another €20 million from its existing investors (Valar Ventures and Alven Capital). The European Investment Bank also became an investor.

In January 2020, Qonto raised a $115 million funding round, led by DST Global and Tencent. In March 2021, the company had more than 150,000 companies using the service. During the times of the coronavirus pandemic, the online bank nearly doubled its business portfolio.

In July 2020, Qonto announced that it surpassed 100,000 customers. In one year, and in the context of the Covid-19 pandemic, its portfolio has almost doubled.

After a new fundraising of €486 million in January 2022, Qonto becomes the most valued unicorn in France with an estimated valuation of €4.4 billion.

In July 2022, Qonto made its first acquisition since its creation by buying its German competitor Penta. With this acquisition, Qonto will have 300,000 customers and more than 1000 employees.

Service 
Qonto is a neobank for freelancers and SMEs.

Qonto offers a professional current account, payment cards and features that make banking and accounting easier for companies.

The Qonto current account is available to French companies formed with the following legal entities:

 SA ('Société Anonyme')
 SAS ('Société par Actions Simplifiée')
 SASU ('Société par Actions Simplifiée Unipersonnelle')
 SARL ('Société à Responsabilité Limitée')
 SC & SCI ('Société civile')
 EURL ('Entreprise Unipersonnelle à Responsabilité Limitée')
 Affaire Personnelle Profession Libérale (Independent occupations)
 Micro-Entreprise (Sole Traders or Micro-Company)
 Association (registered with a siren number)
 Holding (an organisation who owns control of a small group of other companies)

Company 
The company is based in Paris and had over 300 employees in January 2021.

Qonto was ranked as one of the Global Fintech ‘50 Emerging Stars’ by KPMG & H2 Ventures.
Since February 2021, Qonto is the only neobank to be included in the prestigious Next40 index, bringing together the most promising young companies of the French Tech industry.
Qonto reached the ninth position in the Linkedin Top Startups 2020 ranking the 25 top startups in France. In February 2021, Qonto enters the Next40 ranking.

References

External links
 Official website

Banks of France
Neobanks